Kyung-Yung Lee (born December 4, 1966), is a former professional boxer from South Korea. He is the first boxer to win world titles in the minimumweight division. Lee held the Lineal minimumweight title from 1988 to 1989 and the IBF minimumweight title in 1988 .

Professional boxing record

See also
List of IBF world champions
List of minimumweight boxing champions
List of Korean boxers

References

External links
 
 Kyung-Yung Lee - CBZ Profile

|-

|-

1966 births
Living people
Mini-flyweight boxers
Sportspeople from Seoul
South Korean male boxers